Aspidura ceylonensis, also known as the Ceylon keelback, black-spined snake, or slender mould snake, is a colubrid snake endemic to Sri Lanka. It is locally known as කුරුන් කරවලා (kurun karawala) or රත් කරවලා (rath karawala) in Sinhala.

Distribution
Aspidura ceylonensis  is a semi-fossorial snake from submontane forests.

Description
Head is long and snout is broadly rounded. Neck is indistinct. The body is slender with cylindrical, short tail. Dorsal side is crimson brown with a black vertebral line, hence given the name. Dorsum of fore body is brown. Laterally there are a series of black spots in a line. Neck region has a dark brown marking. Venter is crimson colored.

Scalation
Midbody has 17 scale rows. There are 162–207 ventral scales and 37–56 subcaudal scales. The scales are smooth and iridescent.

Ecology
It is a nocturnal and terrestrial snake that lives in damp soil, silted-up drains, beneath heaps of decaying leaves, and in similar places where there are earthworms, its primary prey.

Reproduction
Clutches of two to five eggs are produced in the months of August to November.

References

External links
 Itis.gov
 Animaldiversity.umz.umich.edu
 Eol.org
 Gbif.org

Aspidura
Snakes of Asia
Reptiles of Sri Lanka
Endemic fauna of Sri Lanka
Taxa named by Albert Günther
Reptiles described in 1858